Parvathapur is a locality in Peerzadiguda satellite city of Hyderabad, Telangana, India. 

It falls under Medipally mandal of Medchal district and is administered by Peerzadiguda municipal corporation(PMC), which is one of the fastest growing residential areas of Hyderabad Metropolitan Region.

Etymology 
Parvathapur is portmanteau of two Telugu words: Parvatha and pur, translating to "Mountain settlement".

Parvathapur was merged with Peerzadiguda gram panchayat in 2016 to form Peerzadiguda Municipality which was later upgraded to municipal corporation in 2019.

Institutions 
Aurora’s Technological & Research Institute(ATRI) is located in Parvathapur.

The upcoming new Rachakonda Police Commissionerate campus in Medipally mandal is situated in Parvathapur.

Religious Places 
Sri Lakshmi Narasimha Swamy Temple located in Parvathapur is one of the well known religious places.

Transport 
Uppal metro station is around 5 km from Parvathapur.

References

Villages in Ranga Reddy district